Ctenosauriscidae is an extinct family of pseudosuchian archosaurs within the clade Poposauroidea. Ctenosauriscids existed in Africa, Asia, Europe and North America during the Early Triassic to the Middle Triassic period (latest Olenekian to Anisian stages). All species had large "sails" on their backs. Ctenosauriscids are among some of the earliest archosaurs and represent the first global radiation of the group.

Genera

Phylogeny 
Ctenosauriscidae was named by Oskar Kuhn in 1964 to include the genus Ctenosauriscus. It is a stem-based taxon defined by Richard J. Butler, Stephen L. Brusatte, Mike Reich, Sterling J. Nesbitt, Rainer R. Schoch and Jahn J. Hornung in 2011 as "the most inclusive clade containing Ctenosauriscus koeneni but not Poposaurus gracilis, Effigia okeeffeae, Postosuchus kirkpatricki, Crocodylus niloticus, Ornithosuchus longidens, or Aetosaurus ferratus". The cladograms below follows a 2011 analysis by Butler et al., the first based on Brusatte et al. 2010 and the second based on Nesbitt 2011.

References

 
Triassic reptiles of Asia
Triassic reptiles of Africa
Triassic reptiles of Europe
Triassic reptiles of North America
Olenekian first appearances
Middle Triassic extinctions
Prehistoric reptile families